George McLeod (April 26, 1836 – May 7, 1905) was a Canadian politician, lumber merchant, manufacturer, shipbuilder, shipowner based in New Brunswick.

He was born in Richibucto, New Brunswick, the son of William McLeod and Elizabeth Sutherland, both Scottish immigrants, and was educated there and at the Sackville Academy. McLeod was married twice: to Sarah Abramo Kerr in 1859 and to Sarah Gordon in 1870. He served as an Independent Member of Parliament in the House of Commons of Canada representing Kent, New Brunswick from 1874 until his defeat in the 1878 federal election.  He attempted to return to parliament in the 1882 federal election from the riding of City of Saint John, New Brunswick, but was narrowly defeated by Sir Samuel L. Tilley, the incumbent and Minister of Finance. He died in Saint John, New Brunswick at the age of 69.

External links
 
 History of Federal Riding - Kent

References

Independent MPs in the Canadian House of Commons
Members of the House of Commons of Canada from New Brunswick
1836 births
1905 deaths